Consort Dowager Zhao (趙太妃, personal name unknown) was the mother of Liu Bin (né Liu Hongdu) (Emperor Shang), the second emperor of the Chinese Five Dynasties and Ten Kingdoms period state Southern Han.  She was a concubine to Liu Bin's father, the founding emperor Liu Yan (Emperor Gaozu).

Very little is known about the future Consort Dowager Zhao's background.  It is known that she was considered very beautiful and was favored by Liu Yan.  In 920, she gave birth to his third son Liu Hongdu — who would effectively become his oldest son since Liu Hongdu's older brothers Liu Yaoshu (劉耀樞) and Liu Guitu (劉龜圖) would both die early.  During Liu Yan's Dayou era (928-942), she would receive the imperial consort title Zhaoyi (昭儀).

Liu Yan died in 942 and was succeeded by Liu Hongdu, who changed his name to Liu Bin.  He honored Consort Zhao as consort dowager, but not as empress dowager.  In 943, his younger brother Liu Hongxi the Prince of Jin, whom he had put in command of the government, had his associates Chen Daoxiang (陳道庠) and Liu Sichao (劉思潮) assassinate him, and Liu Hongxi subsequently took the throne (as Emperor Zhongzong).  It is not known what occurred to Consort Dowager Zhao.

References

 Spring and Autumn Annals of the Ten Kingdoms (十國春秋), vol. 61.
 Zizhi Tongjian, vol. 283.

Later Liang (Five Dynasties) people
Southern Han people
Five Dynasties and Ten Kingdoms imperial consorts
10th-century deaths
Year of birth unknown
Chinese concubines